Mordellistena chopardi is a beetle in the genus Mordellistena of the family Mordellidae. It was described in 1950 by Maurice Pic.

References

chopardi
Beetles described in 1950